Bilateral relations exist between the countries of Bahrain and Iran. Since the 1979 Iranian Revolution, relations between the two countries have been strained over various geopolitical issues such as the interpretations of Islam, aspirations for leadership of the Islamic world, and relations with the United States, Europe, and other Western countries. In addition, Iran has been severely critical of Bahrain for hosting the United States Fifth Fleet within the Persian Gulf at the Naval Support Activity Bahrain base.

After the Saudi diplomatic missions in Iran were ransacked by Iranian protesters following the execution of Nimr al-Nimr, Bahrain followed Saudi Arabia's decision by severing diplomatic relations with Iran on January 4, 2016. On 16 April 2019, a court in Bahrain sentenced 139 people to prison for forming terrorist groups backed by Iran.  A total of 169 were arrested.

Relations under Pahlavi dynasty
Iran had a historic claim to Bahrain until March 1970 when Shah Mohammad Reza Pahlavi abandoned the claim as a result of secret Anglo-Iranian negotiations. Following this realignment of policy, the two countries signed a demarcation agreement in 1970.

Relations under the Islamic republic
Following the Iranian Revolution in which Ayatollah Khomeini came to power in Iran in 1979, Iran made clear its intention to export its Islamic revolution throughout the Muslim world, especially in the Arab world.

Two years later, Bahraini Shia fundamentalists orchestrated a coup attempt under the auspices of a front organization, the Islamic Front for the Liberation of Bahrain. The coup, which failed, would have installed a Shia cleric exiled in Iran, Hujjat al-Islam Hādī al-Mudarrisī, as the Supreme Leader of Bahrain with a theocratic government. The Bahraini government unofficially regarded the coup as Iran attempting to overthrow their Sunni government. Iran denied any involvement, saying the fundamentalists were inspired by the Iranian revolution but had received no support from Iran. Fearful of a recurrence, Bahrain cracked down on its Shia population, putting thousands into jail and further souring relations with Iran.

In November 2007, President Mahmoud Ahmadinejad of Iran made his first official visit to Bahrain and met with King Hamad bin Isa Al Khalifa. Ahmadinejad discussed future agreements to supply Bahrain with natural gas during his meeting with the king and Bahraini officials. Iran and Bahrain are beginning to enjoy closer relations again and have engaged in many joint economic ventures.

In the aftermath of the March 2011 protests in Bahrain, Iran expressed strong support for the demonstrators, the majority of whom follow Shia Islam, which is Iran's state religion. Relations between Tehran and Manama cooled considerably during the uprising, with both countries expelling one another's ambassadors. Iran was joined by Iraq in opposing the Gulf Cooperation Council's military intervention in Bahrain. Allies of the Bahraini government, such as Saudi Arabia and other GCC member states, have conversely blamed Iran for inciting upheaval in the small archipelago country and questioned the legitimacy of the protesters' demands, echoing Manama's claims.

On 12 August 2012, Foreign Minister of Bahrain Sheikh Khalid al-Khalifa announced from his Twitter account that Bahrain had reinstated its ambassador to Iran, nearly 18 months after relations between the two countries were strained following the 2011 Bahrain protests.

On 19 July 2015, after Supreme Leader Ali Khamenei voiced support for the oppressed people across the Middle East, including Bahrain, the Iranian acting chargé d'affaires Morteza Sanubari was summoned by the Foreign Minister of Bahrain over "flagrant interference". The foreign minister handed "an official protest memorandum" to the diplomat over "statements made by Ali Khamenei against the Kingdom of Bahrain".

On 13 August 2015, the Bahrain Interior Ministry announced arresting of five members of a terrorist group which was linked to at least one bombing attack in Sitra and was believed to accept aid and training from Lebanese militant group Hezbollah and Iran's Islamic Revolutionary Guard Corps (IRGC).

On 1 October 2015 (a week after the 2015 Mina stampede), the Bahraini government recalled its ambassador from Tehran and ordered the Iranian acting chargé d'affaires to leave the country within 3 days in response to "continuing interference by Iran in the affairs of the kingdom". This comes after Bahraini authorities in Nuwaidrat (30 September) discovered a large bomb-making factory and seized a large stash of weapons and arrested a number of people suspected of having links with Iran's Revolutionary Guards. Bahrain's decision to recall its ambassador comes "in light of continued Iranian meddling in the affairs of the kingdom of Bahrain ... in order to create sectarian strife and to impose hegemony and control. In response (on 2 October), the Iranian Foreign Ministry retaliated by releasing this statement: "The number two official in Bahrain's embassy in Tehran is persona non grata and Mr. Bassam al-Dossari must leave Iran's territory within 72 hours," the official IRNA news agency quoted a foreign ministry statement as saying late Friday. Often, Bahrain alleges that Iran is responsible for the protests among its Shia population, according to Aljazeera.

According to the guardian, sometimes the Bahraini government tells visitors from the U.S confidentially, that Iran backs some Shi’a oppositionists.

Relations following 2016 attack on the Saudi diplomatic missions in Iran

Following the 2016 attack on the Saudi diplomatic missions in Iran, the Foreign Minister of Bahrain "strongly condemned the two terrorist attacks on the Embassy of the Kingdom of Saudi Arabia in Tehran and its consulate in Mashhad in the  Islamic Republic of Iran." In a statement, it said that "these demagogic and barbarian acts represent flagrant violation to the international convictions and norms, and the Vienna Convention which all safeguard the security and protection to the diplomatic missions."

On 4 January 2016, Bahrain severed diplomatic ties with Iran, accusing it of interference in Saudi internal affairs after Saudi Arabia executed prominent Shia cleric Nimr al-Nimr for his involvement in 2011–12 Saudi Arabian protests. This was followed by the same decision of the Saudi government.

On 9 January 2016, Bahrain's national airline Gulf Air announced that it would suspend flights between Bahrain International Airport and Tehran Imam Khomeini International Airport on 14 January. Mohammad Khodakarami, the deputy for aviation and international affairs of Iran's Civil Aviation Organization (CAO), has been quoted in state media as saying that Gulf Air made the announcement through a letter to Iran's Civil Aviation Organization. Khodakarami said that the airline's flights will remain suspended until further notice.

2022 FIFA World Cup qualification
In the 2022 World Cup qualifiers, Bahrain was grouped together with Iran, thus attracted many Bahrainis to take interest in the encounter due to tensions between Bahrain and Iran. At the first match between Bahrain and Iran in Manama, tensions were seen with Bahrainis booed and whistled the anthem of Iran and jeering of Iranian players. The match ended with a shock historic 1–0 win for Bahrain, the first time Bahrain beat Iran in 10 years. FIFA had fined Bahrain for the incident.

Bahrain's peace treaty with Israel
On September 11, 2020, Bahrain announced it would establish official ties with Israel. The surprising normalization attempt by Bahrain has prompted anger from the Iranian leadership, as many Iranian officials openly denounced the deal and accused Bahrain of working with Zionist groups.

Renewed territorial claim from Iran
Amidst recent public unrest across Iran related to the death of Mahsa Amini, Iranian government has begun laying claims around Bahrain with a revisionist aim, denying Bahrain's rights to exist, a move which was seen by Bahrain as a clear threat to its sovereignty.

Revocation of Isa Qassim's citizenship

On 20 June 2016, Isa Qassim was stripped of his Bahraini citizenship. An interior ministry statement accused Sheikh Isa Qassim of using his position to "serve foreign interests" and promote "sectarianism and violence". Announcing the move to strip him of his Bahraini citizenship, the interior ministry said the cleric had "adopted theocracy and stressed the absolute allegiance to the clergy". It added that he had been in continuous contact with "organizations and parties that are enemies of the kingdom". Bahrain's citizenship law allows for the cabinet to revoke the citizenship of anyone who "causes harm to the interests of the kingdom or behaves in a way inimical with the duty of loyalty to it".

Iranian reactions
The Supreme Leader of Iran, Ali Khamenei, said in a speech carried by state media, "This is blatant foolishness and insanity. When he still could address the Bahraini people, Sheikh Isa Qassim would advise against radical and armed actions" and "Attacking Sheikh Isa Qassim means removing all obstacles blocking heroic Bahraini youths from attacking the regime".
Ali Larijani, Speaker of the Iranian parliament condemned the action, saying "this was an impolitic and quite an adventurous move by the Bahraini regime which assumed that by revoking the nationality of this prominent spiritual leader, it could lead the country’s domestic political crisis toward tranquility" and "the Al-Khalifa regime must take a careful look at this historical record that clearly shows once a government starts threatening the influential figures of its nation with revocation of citizenship, it is taking its last breaths".
In a statement published by Fars News Agency, Major-General Qassem Soleimani, commander of the Islamic Revolutionary Guard Corps Quds Force said: "The Al Khalifa [rulers of Bahrain] surely know their aggression against Sheikh Isa Qassim is a red line that crossing it would set Bahrain and the whole region on fire, and it would leave no choice for people but to resort to armed resistance. The Al Khalifa regime will definitely pay the price for that and their blood-thirsty regime will be toppled."

See also
 Iran–Saudi Arabia relations
 Iran-Saudi Arabia proxy conflict

References

 
Iran
Bahrain
Shia–Sunni relations
Relations of colonizer and former colony